Jason Love Lawson (born September 2, 1974) is an American former professional basketball player and coach.

Playing career
The 6'11", 240 pound forward-center went to college at Villanova University. He played with the Orlando Magic in the 1997–98 NBA season after being selected by the Denver Nuggets in the 1997 NBA Draft. In his only NBA season he played in 17 games, averaging 4.7 minutes per game, he had a field goal percentage of 60.0%.  He had an 80.0% free throw accuracy.  He had an average of 1.6 rebounds per game.  He also averaged 0.3 assists per game, 0.2 steals per game, 0.2 blocks per game and 1.5 points per game.

Lawson played for the Grand Rapids Hoops of the Continental Basketball Association (CBA) and was selected to the CBA All-Defensive Team in 2000.

Coaching career
Lawson continues to coach in the Philadelphia area with the private coaching service, CoachUp.

References

External links
Basketball-Reference.com (NBA) Profile
FIBA Europe Profile
Basketball-Reference.com (Europe) Profile
Basketball-Reference.com (G-League) Profile
RealGM.com Profile
Eurobasket.com Profile
NCAA College Stats
Spanish League Archive Profile 

1974 births
Living people
African-American basketball players
American expatriate basketball people in France
American expatriate basketball people in Greece
American expatriate basketball people in Jordan
American expatriate basketball people in Mexico
American expatriate basketball people in Spain
American men's basketball coaches
American men's basketball players
Centers (basketball)
Columbus Riverdragons players
Denver Nuggets draft picks
Élan Béarnais players
Grand Rapids Hoops players
Halcones Rojos Veracruz players
Harlem Globetrotters players
Liga ACB players
Orléans Loiret Basket players
Orlando Magic players
Panionios B.C. players
Parade High School All-Americans (boys' basketball)
Power forwards (basketball)
Real Betis Baloncesto players
Universiade gold medalists for the United States
Universiade medalists in basketball
Villanova Wildcats men's basketball players
Medalists at the 1995 Summer Universiade
Basketball players from Philadelphia
21st-century African-American sportspeople
20th-century African-American sportspeople